This is a list of known royal consorts of ancient Egypt from c.3100 BC to 30 BC. Reign dates follow those included on the list of Pharaohs page. Some information is debatable and interpretations of available evidence can vary between Egyptologists.

Background

The Pharaoh's wives played an important role both in public and private life, and would be a source of political and religious power. Pharaohs usually had many different wives, so that a successor could be guaranteed to succeed him. If a queen succeeded in producing an heir that inherited the throne, she would reach a position of great honour as King's Mother and may be able to rule Egypt on behalf of her son as regent if he was underage. While there are many known cases of kings marrying their sisters, there were also wives of non-royal birth, such as Tiye and Nefertiti. Kings such as Amenhotep III and Ramesses II are known to have married some of their daughters, though it is possible these marriages were symbolic and ceremonial rather than incestuous. Apart from the chief consort, the Pharaoh would have many wives in the harem, who could be foreign-born princesses or lower-ranking Egyptian women who had little impact on politics.

While women did occasionally rule as Pharaohs, they generally did not rule while married except during the Ptolemaic period. Thus, male consorts never existed during the time of the native Egyptian royal dynasties, and only Berenice IV and Cleopatra VII are listed as having male consorts who did not rule as Pharaohs.

List of female rulers and co-rulers
Most Queens included on this page did not rule as Pharaohs. However, some did rule in their own right following the deaths of their husbands. Four Queens from the Native Egyptian dynasties are known for certain to have ruled as Female Pharaohs:
 Sobekneferu (c. 1806-1802 BC) (Possibly wife of Amenemhat IV)
 Hatshepsut (c. 1479-1458 BC) (Wife of Thutmose II)
 Neferneferuaten (c. 1334-1332 BC) (Wife of either Akhenaten or Smenkhare depending on her identity)
 Twosret (c. 1191-1189 BC) (Wife of Seti II)

There has also been some debate on whether certain Queen regents such as Neithotep, Merneith, Khentkaus I and Khentkaus II did rule as Female Pharaohs or not. However, there is yet to be any concrete evidence that they did. The legendary Queen Nitocris was supposedly a Pharaoh at the end of the Sixth Dynasty, but no archeological evidence supports her existence.

The Ptolemaic Dynasty implemented a policy of co-rule between spouses starting with Ptolemy II and Arsinoe II. Therefore, most Queens from this dynasty are not listed as consorts as they were co-rulers of Egypt while married to their husbands. The following is a list of Female rulers and co-rulers of the Ptolemaic Dynasty:
 Arsinoe II (c. 277-270 BC) ruled alongside her brother-husband Ptolemy II.
 Berenice II (c. 244-222 BC) ruled alongside her husband Ptolemy III.
 Arsinoe III (220-204 BC) ruled alongside her brother-husband Ptolemy IV.
 Cleopatra I (193-176 BC) ruled alongside her husband Ptolemy V and as a regent on behalf of her son Ptolemy VI.
 Cleopatra II (175-164, 163–127, 124-116 BC) ruled alongside her brother-husband Ptolemy VI, her younger brother (later husband) Ptolemy VIII, her son Ptolemy VII, her daughter Cleopatra III and briefly her grandson Ptolemy IX. She was the sole ruler of Egypt from 131 to 127 BC, the first woman to do so since Twosret over a millennia before.
 Cleopatra III (142-131, 127-101 BC) ruled alongside her uncle-husband Ptolemy VIII, her mother Cleopatra II, her eldest son Ptolemy IX, her daughter Cleopatra IV and her second eldest son Ptolemy X.
 Cleopatra IV (116-115 BC) briefly ruled alongside her brother-husband Ptolemy IX and mother Cleopatra III before being pushed out by her mother.
 Berenice III (101-88, 81-80 BC) ruled alongside her uncle-husband Ptolemy X, her father Ptolemy IX and her brother-husband Ptolemy XI. She briefly ruled by herself from 81 BC to 80 BC before she was murdered on the orders of Ptolemy XI.
 Cleopatra V (79-68 BC) ruled alongside her husband Ptolemy XII.
 Cleopatra VI (58-57 BC) ruled alongside her sister Berenice IV. However, some historians theorise she may actually be the same person as Cleopatra V.
 Berenice IV (58-55 BC) briefly ruled alongside her sister (or possibly mother) Cleopatra VI, but otherwise spent most of her reign as the sole ruler of Egypt.
 Cleopatra VII (51-30 BC) ruled alongside her father Ptolemy XII, her brother-husband Ptolemy XIII, her second brother-husband Ptolemy XIV and her son Ptolemy XV.
 Arsinoe IV (48-47 BC) ruled alongside her brother Ptolemy XIII in opposition to their sister Cleopatra VII.

List of regents
Occasionally when the new Pharaoh was too young to rule, his mother or step-mother would rule temporarily as a regent on his behalf. Because they did not hold the title of 'King' during their time in power, they are generally not included on Lists of Pharaohs. The following Queens are likely to have ruled as regents:
 Neithhotep possibly ruled on behalf of her son Hor-Aha (c. 3050)
 Merneith ruled on behalf of her son Den (c. 2970)
 Nimaathap possibly ruled on behalf of her son Djoser (c. 2670)
 Khentkaus I likely ruled as a regent, but her son or sons are unknown.
 Khentkaus II possibly ruled as a regent for one of her sons (Neferefre or Nyuserre Ini).
 Iput I possibly ruled as a regent for her son Pepi I (c. 2332)
 Ankhesenpepi II ruled as a regent for her son Pepi II (c. 2278)
 Ahhotep I ruled as a regent for her son Ahmose I (c. 1550)
 Ahmose-Nefertari ruled as a regent for her son Amenhotep I (c. 1541)
 Hatshepsut initially ruled as a regent for her step-son Thutmose III (c. 1479) before becoming Pharaoh and co-ruler.
 Mutemwiya ruled as a regent for her son Amenhotep III (c. 1388)
 Twosret ruled as a regent for her step-son Siptah (c. 1197)

Predynastic Period

Dynasty "Zero" (Before c. 3100 BC)

Early Dynastic Period

First Dynasty (c. 3100–2890 BC)

Second Dynasty (c. 2890–2686 BC)

Old Kingdom

Third Dynasty (c. 2686–2613 BC)

Fourth Dynasty (c. 2613–2494 BC)

Fifth Dynasty (c. 2494–2345 BC)

Sixth Dynasty (c. 2345–2181 BC)

First Intermediate Period

Seventh, Eighth, Ninth and Tenth Dynasties (c. 2181–2040 BC)
No known queens from these dynasties.

Early Eleventh Dynasty (c. 2130–2040 BC)

Middle Kingdom

Eleventh Dynasty Continued (c. 2040–1991 BC)

Twelfth Dynasty (c. 1991–1802 BC)

Second Intermediate Period

Thirteenth Dynasty (c. 1802–1649 BC)

Fourteenth Dynasty (c. 1725–1650 BC)

Fifteenth Dynasty (c. 1649–1550 BC)

Sixteenth Dynasty (c. 1650–1582 BC)

Seventeenth Dynasty (c. 1582–1550 BC)

New Kingdom

Eighteenth Dynasty (c. 1550–1292 BC)

Nineteenth Dynasty (c. 1292–1189 BC)

Twentieth Dynasty (c. 1189–1077 BC)

Third Intermediate Period

Twenty-first Dynasty (c. 1077–943 BC)

Wives of the High Priests of Amun (c. 1080–943 BC)
While they were not officially pharaohs, the High Priests of Amun at Thebes were the de facto rulers of Upper Egypt during the Twenty-first dynasty, writing their names in cartouches and being buried in royal tombs. Their wives would have held a similar status to most other queens.

Twenty-second Dynasty (c. 943–720 BC)

Twenty-third Dynasty (c. 837–720 BC)

Twenty-fourth Dynasty (c. 732–720 BC)
No known Queens from this dynasty.

Twenty-fifth Dynasty (Nubian Dynasty) (c. 760–656 BC)

Late Period

Twenty-sixth Dynasty (Saite Dynasty) (672–525 BC)

Twenty-seventh Dynasty (First Persian Dynasty) (525–404 BC)
The Persian kings of Egypt generally ruled the country from afar and thus their wives played little to no part in Egyptian life and culture. As stated by Egyptologist Joyce Tyldesley, "to all intents and purposes, Egypt was without a queen throughout the 27th and 31st Dynasties".

Twenty-eighth and Twenty-ninth Dynasties (404–380 BC)
No known Queens from these dynasties.

Thirtieth Dynasty (380–343 BC)

Thirty-first Dynasty (Second Persian Dynasty) (343–332 BC)

Hellenistic Period

Argead Dynasty (332–309 BC)

Ptolemaic Dynasty (305–30 BC)
Most Queens of this dynasty starting with Arsinoe II held power as co-rulers with their husbands. Below is a list of consorts who are not known to have held power as co-rulers.

Notes

A  Thutmose III and Hatshepsut-Meryetre had two daughters named Meritamen.

See also
 Great Royal Wife
 God's Wife of Amun
 List of pharaohs
 List of Roman and Byzantine empresses – Consorts of the Roman and Byzantine emperors who ruled Egypt from 30 B.C. to 642.
 List of consorts of the Muhammad Ali dynasty – Egyptian royal consorts from 1805 to 1953.

References

Further reading
 
 

Royal consorts
Ancient Egypt